James Lawrence Irving (born February 16, 1935) is a former United States district judge of the United States District Court for the Southern District of California.

Education and career

Born in San Diego, California, Irving was in the United States Army from 1954 to 1956. He received a Bachelor of Science degree from the University of Southern California in 1959 and a Bachelor of Laws from the USC Gould School of Law in 1963. He was in private practice in San Diego from 1963 to 1982.

Federal judicial service

On July 15, 1982, Irving was nominated by President Ronald Reagan to a seat on the United States District Court for the Southern District of California vacated by Judge Edward Joseph Schwartz. Irving was confirmed by the United States Senate on July 28, 1982, and received his commission the same day. Irving served in that capacity until his resignation on December 31, 1990.

Resignation

Irving resigned due to a belief that federal mandatory minimum sentencing guidelines were unconstitutional and immoral. "If I remain on the bench I have no choice but to follow the law," he said. "I just can't, in good conscience, continue to do this".

References

Sources
 

1935 births
Living people
Judges of the United States District Court for the Southern District of California
United States district court judges appointed by Ronald Reagan
20th-century American judges
USC Gould School of Law alumni
United States Army soldiers